The Puerto Rico State Guard (PRSG) —— is the state defense force of Puerto Rico that operates under the sole authority of the governor of Puerto Rico who, in turn, delegates such authority to the Puerto Rico Adjutant General. The Guard's secondary purpose is to assume the state mission of the Puerto Rico National Guard in the event that the National Guard is mobilized. The first incarnation of the PRSG was created in 1941 in response to World War II and it disbanded in 1946. The PRSG was revived in 1971 and has remained in continuous existence since then.  The PRSG is one of the few state defense forces of the United States that has an air division.

Overview
The PRSG is a voluntary professional military corps and one of the Major Subordinate Commands of the Puerto Rico Military Forces, which includes the Puerto Rico Army National Guard and the Puerto Rico Air National Guard. The PRSG respond directly to the Adjutant General of Puerto Rico, is commanded by a brigadier general and is composed of main units in San Juan metropolitan area and in the cities of Ponce (South), Mayagüez (West), Caguas (Center), and Ceiba (East). The Puerto Rico State Guard is among the most active and largest State Defense Forces (SDFs) in the Nation with almost 1,500 troops organized in 6 Support Groups, a separate SAR Company, a Military Academy, an Air Base Group and HHQs .

The State Defense Forces (SDF's) (also known as state guards, state military reserves, or state militias) in the United States are military units that operate under the sole authority of a state government and they are partially regulated by the National Guard Bureau. As a Constitutional Authority Article I, section 8 of the U.S. Constitution endorses the existence and potential value of armies, the Navy, and the militia, and establishes basic roles for Federal and state governments with respect to their administration and operation. However, Article I, section 10 of the U.S. Constitution prohibits states from maintaining State Guards in times of peace, without the express consent of Congress. Provisions for states to maintain State Defense Forces (SDF) are outlined in section 109, title 32, United States Code(32 U.S.C. § 109 [2013]). They are probably the least well-known military element operating in the U.S. Initially established by Congress in the early 20th century and authorized in their current form in 1955, there were active SDF in 22 states and Puerto Rico, as of March 2014. SDF's are authorized by state and federal law and are under the command of the governor of each state. The US Congress recognized the need for governors and States to keep military troops even if the President calls the state National Guard for federal military service. For that reason, the Congress authorize the SDF's under Title 32 of the United States Code.

The PRSG is the State Defense Force (SDF) of Puerto Rico and has the capability to support the Puerto Rico National Guard (PRNG) Operations in security operations, engineering, transportation, chaplaincy, emergency management, legal, and medical services among others operational areas. As part of the Puerto Rico National Guard Family the PRSG is also known as the State Command of the Puerto Rico National Guard.

It is noteworthy that, along with Texas, California and New York, the PRSG is one of the few SDF's that has an Air Division that embrace the Air Force culture. The 1st Air Base Group, located at Muñiz Air National Guard Base, is an excellent example of integration and teamwork with the PRANG units, specially with the 156th Airlift Wing. The 1st Air Base Group is composed of a Headquarters Squadron, a Mission Support Squadron (Engineering Flight, Services Flight, Personnel Flight, Security Forces Flight and Fire Fighter Flight),a Medical Squadron, and a Logistic Squadron (Transportation Flight, Supply Flight and an Aerial Port Flight). Currently, the 1ABG have two support units for the 141st Air Control Squadron in Aguadilla and the 140th Air Defense Squadron in Punta Salinas. All 1st Air Base Group units are organized to meet the military training requirements necessary to take over the Puerto Rico Air National Guard installations upon mobilization and deployment of their units.

The 1st Air Base Group training is conducted in accordance with USAF regulations, which supplements the PRSG and PRNG regulations, directives and guidance. Unit Training Assemblies (UTA's) are performed jointly with PRANG's 156th AW in a consolidated drill concept. These trainings are performed jointly with 156th AW personnel. It allows 1ABG personnel to acquire hands-on experience of what their duty will be if PRANG units are mobilize and deployed. It also gives them the opportunity to be trained by their counterpart in their specialty and get the feeling of a real life scenario, while getting ready for it. These drills are performed concurrently with 156th AW UTA schedule.

History
The PRSG considers itself a direct descendant of the Spanish Volunteer Regiments created during Spanish Colonial which was later replaced by the US Volunteer Infantry in 1898. With most of the Puerto Rico National Guard being activated and mobilized during World War II, a secondary force was proposed to deal with the area of Puerto Rico. In April 1942, the colonial legislature passed Law 28, which approved the creation of a new militia-based program to fill the role of the soldiers that had left. The legislation specified that the placeholder entity would only serve within the borders of Puerto Rico and would have to meet standards similar to the PRNG. Gen. Luis Esteves was responsible for organizing the State Guard, establishing nine Regiments composed by three battalions. Companies were scattered throughout Puerto Rico, under the supervision of experimented Colonels. The role of Judge Advocate was handed to Samuel Quiñones, then president of the colonial senate. Medical and other initiatives were completed with civilian volunteers, including Ramón Suárez. A band, led by Luis Miranda, was also created. The State Guard tried to promote itself in the media, publishing a government-sponsored magazine named Centinela Alerta and a column in newspaper El Mundo. After the war concluded and the PRNG returned, the State Guard was disbanded. Colonial governor and Gen. Esteves awarded a certificate to all the enlisted men, while those that served at least three years were also given a medal approved by the legislature.

The modern PRSG reformed in 1976 following the approval of the Military Law of Puerto Rico it's considered the state controlled branch of the PRNG. This group was formed to provide Puerto Rico a trained and organized military force in the event of a state security emergency or if the National Guard is deployed. The PRSG is the state's authorized militia and assumes the state mission of the Puerto Rico National Guard in the event the Guard is mobilized. The PRSG comprises retired, active and reserve military personnel and selected professional persons who volunteer their time and talents in further service to their state.

The modern PRSG reformed in 1976 by the virtue of the Military Code of Puerto Rico (Law Num. 62 from June 23, 1969 and amendments) and is considered the state-controlled branch of the PRNG. By law, the Puerto Rico State Guard is part of the Total Force and one of three components of the Puerto Rico Military Forces, reporting to The Puerto Rico Adjutant General.

Role

The task of the PRSG is to offer support, in its totality, to the Puerto Rico National Guard (PRNG) when the latter is activated by the Governor of Puerto Rico or called to active service by the President of the United States. The PRSG also represents the Puerto Rico National Guard in civic activities, and supports the PRNG in cases of emergencies.

With the approved resources, the State Guard of Puerto Rico will be able to recruit and to train personnel to provide the security and defense with the armories; as well as to assist the civilian authorities in cases of natural disasters, emergencies and serious disturbances of public order. These volunteers will offer support and provide services to the community by means of health clinics.

In the PRSG, there is a large representation of prior service soldiers with extensive combat and command experience as well as non-priors with significant professional and paramilitary backgrounds which greatly enhance the organization. A large proportion of PRSG soldiers are active members of State Guard Association of the United States (SGAUS) and a few senior officers and NCOs hold leadership positions in the organization.

The PRSG have been a very active force multiplier for the PRNG, supporting Federal mobilizations (legal and medical support), and its current mission is to assist the National Guard especially in concern to homeland security and SAR duties (natural disasters, civil disturbances, communities service and facilities management).

The PRSG is the state's authorized militia and assumes the state mission of the Puerto Rico National Guard in the event the Guard is mobilized. The PRSG comprises retired, active and reserve military personnel and selected professional persons who volunteer their time and talents in further service to their state.

As a state organized militia, the PRSG ranks are official state military ranks in accordance with Article 1, Section 8, Clause 16 of the United States Constitution were the US Congress received the power “to provide for organizing, arming, and disciplining, the Militia, and for governing such Part of them as may be employed in the Service of the United States, reserving to the States respectively, the Appointment of the Officers, and the Authority of training the Militia according to the discipline prescribed by Congress”. All PRSG appointments, commissions, warrants, and enlistments are recognized and authorized by the Governor of Puerto Rico through the Adjutant General of PR. The PRSG military personnel render to all members of the military community, and receive from them, all courtesies common to all such members, such as saluting, and forms of address.

Unlike the Civil Air Patrol or the United States Coast Guard Auxiliary, the PRSG is a statutory military entity of the Commonwealth of Puerto Rico with each PRSG member subject to the Uniform Code of Military Justice (UCMJ) per the Military Code of Puerto Rico. Under state law, enlisted members and officers of the PRSG have the same similar legal status, privileges, and /or immunities as members of the state National Guard (in state status) when called to State Active Duty (SAD) or in drill status.

Generally, the PRSG soldiers and airmen are not paid for drills, UTAs or annual training. However, because the PRSG is a state military force, members are subject to call to state active duty by the governor. When that happens, PRSG members are paid at the same rate of pay for their rank or grade as their National Guard counterparts. The Governor of Puerto Rico may provide for the use of the forces of Puerto Rico State Guard barracks, weapons and equipment from the National Guard of Puerto Rico as are not in current use by that body, as well as those buildings and public properties which are available. The Governor may request the Secretary of the Army of the United States to provide to the Puerto Rico State Guard all the weapons and equipment that could be provided to these forces by the Department of the Army of the United States.

Like other State Defense Forces, the PRSG is not eligible for federal service. However, 10 USC 331-333 may grant powers to the federal government to call up the PRSG since militia is defined as both organized (National Guard) and unorganized under 10 USC 311(b). In addition, Article II, Section II of the United States Constitution further states: "The President shall be commander in chief of the Army and Navy of the United States, and of the militia of the several states, when called into the actual service of the United States"

As stated by the Department of Defense (DoD) Inspector General in the 2014 Evaluation of Department of Defense Interaction with State Defense Forces Report: “Accordingly, as a state organization, the SDF (PRSG members) would not be eligible for Federal benefits, such as pensions and access to the Federal military healthcare system. However, this prohibition did not prohibit DoD from sharing with the SDF (PRSG) any equipment or other resources acquired with Federal funds providing it furthers DoD missions.”

The law also grant employment protection to any person that belongs to Puerto Rico State Guard and that because of it to be absent from employment, for State Active Duty or training.

This major command was formed to provide Puerto Rico a trained and organized military force in the event of a state security emergency or if the National Guard is deployed. The PRSG comprises retired, active and reserve military personnel and selected professional persons who volunteer their time and talents in further service to their state.

The PRSG is organized in the following subordinates units:

The PRSG Military Institute offers specialized and general training to its soldiers. Some examples of training offered either at state or local levels include:

Structure

 Executive branch of the government of Puerto Rico & National Guard Bureau
 Puerto Rico National Guard
 Puerto Rico State Guard
 1st Army Support Group
 2nd Army Support Group
 3rd Army Support Group
 4th Army Support Group
 1st Air Base Group
 1st Medical Group
 1st Engineering Group
 Search & Rescue Company
 Military Academy

See also

Military history of Puerto Rico
Puerto Rico Wing Civil Air Patrol
State Guard Association of the United States
1st Air Base Group

References
Notes

Citations

Bibliography

External links 
 Puerto Rico Code of Military Justice (Spanish)
 Puerto Rico State Guard Regulations 600-100 & 600-200
 1st Air Base Group Guidelines for the use of the USAF Professional Specialty Badges by PRSG Air Force Personnel
 Evaluation of Department of Defense Interaction with State Defense Forces
 National Guard Regulation 10-4, "National Guard Interaction With State Defense Forces", 2011.
  "Puerto Rico Law Enforcement Academy"
 U.S. Army War College Paper "State Defense Forces and Homeland Security"; Arthus Tulak, Robert Kraft, and Don Silbaugh, 2004.
 DoD Report to the Senate and House Armed Services Committees on Homeland Defense Force for Homeland Defense and Homeland Security Missions, November 2005 HR Report 108-491.
 
 American Legion Magazine "A well-regulated militia," 2008.

Puerto Rico National Guard
State defense forces of the United States